NK Jedinstvo Omladinac is a Croatian football club based in the village of Nedešćina.

History

The club is founded in 2003 after the merger between NK Jedinstvo from Nedešćina (which was founded in 1950) and NK Omladinac from Sveti Martin (which was founded in 1960).

For some time club carried the name NK Jedinstvo Omladinac Kapra.

External links
NK Jedinstvo Omladinac at Nogometni magazin 

Football clubs in Croatia
Football clubs in Istria County
Association football clubs established in 2003
2003 establishments in Croatia